Johan Herman Lie Vogt (14 October 18583 January 1932) was a Norwegian geologist and petrologist. Vogt was a professor at the University of Oslo and at the 
Norwegian Institute of Technology.

Biography
Vogt was born in Tvedestrand, Norway. He was a son of physician Olaus Fredrik Sand Vogt and Mathilde Eliza Lie. He was the nephew of mathematician  Sophus Lie (1842–1899). Psychiatrist Ragnar Vogt (1870-1943) was a younger brother.
Vogt studied at the Technical Institute in Dresden and in 1880 graduated from the University of Christiania (now University of Oslo). Vogt was cand.min. from 1880.

Career
Vogt was appointed professor in metallurgy at the University of Christiania from 1886 to 1912. When the Norwegian Institute of Technology in Trondheim was established.  Vogt became the college's first professor of geology  and held the position 1912-28.  Vogt was responsible for developing the institute's department of geology. He was succeeded by his son Thorolf Vogt.  Johan  Vogt was awarded the Wollaston Medal by the Geological Society of London in 1932.

Selected works
Norsk marmor -  1895
Die Silikatschmelzlösungen -  1903
De gamle norske jernverk -  1908
Norges jernmalmforekomster  - 1910

Personal life
He married Martha Johanne Abigael Kinck in 1887. He was the father of  engineer Fredrik Vogt (1892-1970),  geologist   Thorolf Vogt (1888-1958), social economist Johan Vogt (1900-1991) and newspaper editor Jørgen Vogt (1900-1972).

References

1858 births
1932 deaths
People from Tvedestrand
Petrologists
19th-century Norwegian geologists
20th-century Norwegian geologists
University of Oslo alumni
Academic staff of the University of Oslo
Academic staff of the Norwegian Institute of Technology
Wollaston Medal winners